Fridolf in the Lion's Den (Swedish: Fridolf i lejonkulan) is a 1933 Swedish comedy film directed by Weyler Hildebrand and starring Fridolf Rhudin, Aino Taube and Björn Berglund. It was shot at the Sundbyberg Studios of Europa Film in Stockholm.

Synopsis
Fridolf gets married without realising that his first wife is still alive and he has committed bigamy. He tracks his wife down when the circus comes to town.

Cast
 Fridolf Rhudin as 	Fridolf Svensson
 Weyler Hildebrand as 	Police inspector Göransson
 Gueye Rolf as 	Ludmila
 Björn Berglund as 	Erik
 Aino Taube as 	Margit Vedholm
 Julia Cæsar as 	Mrs. Jonsson
 Rut Holm as 	Beda
 Erik A. Petschler as Circus manager
 Wiola Brunius as 	Girl at the shooting gallery 
 Alice Carlsson as 	Clerk at the circus 
 Lena Cederström as 	Girl at the shooting gallery 
 Joel Jansson as 	Officer Tysk 
 Ludde Juberg as	Circus worker 
 Artur Rolén as 	Pharmacist 
 Holger Sjöberg as 	Polish wrestler 
 Åke Uppström as 	Circus visitor 
 Ruth Weijden	as Barnmorskan

References

Bibliography 
 Larsson, Mariah & Marklund, Anders. Swedish Film: An Introduction and Reader. Nordic Academic Press, 2010.

External links 
 

1933 films
Swedish comedy films
1933 comedy films
1930s Swedish-language films
Films directed by Weyler Hildebrand
Swedish black-and-white films
1930s Swedish films